KLAY (1180 AM) is a radio station broadcasting a news/talk/sports information format. Located in Lakewood, Washington, United States, the station serves the Tacoma area.  The station is owned by Sacred Heart Radio. The station features news, talk, weather, traffic, and sports reporting. KLAY has been on the air for about 53 years. Broadcasting coverage is roughly from Downtown Seattle south through the state capital of Olympia.

History
The station went on the air as KFHA at 1480 AM and changed its call sign to KOOD in 1966, and then to KQLA in 1978, and finally to KLAY in April 1980.  On May 1, 1990, the station changed its call sign to KDFL, and on June 28, 1991 to the current KLAY.

References

External links

LAY
News and talk radio stations in the United States
Lakewood, Washington